Al-Ansariyyah, Ansariyeh, or Insariye (Insârîyé) is a town in South Governorate in Lebanon, 62 km from Beirut and 20 km south of Sidon. The area is 7.35 km² and is situated near the sea facing it from an altitude of 144 m.

T. E. Lawrence wrote about the community of Ansariya in his 1922 book Seven Pillars of Wisdom.
"[A] main component of the coast population was the community of Ansariya, those disciples of a cult of fertility, sheer pagan, anti-foreign, distrustful of Islam, drawn at moments towards Christians by common persecution. The sect, vital in itself, was clannish in feeling and politics. One Nosairi would not betray another, and would hardly not betray an unbeliever. Their villages lay in patches down the main hills to the Tripoli gap. They spoke Arabic, but had lived there since the beginning of Greek letters in Syria. Usually they stood aside from affairs, and left the Turkish Government alone in hope of reciprocity. Mixed among the Ansariyeh were colonies of Syrian Christians; and in the bend of the Orontes had been some firm blocks of Armenians, inimical to Turkey. Inland, near Harim were Druses, Arabic in origin; and some Circassians from the Caucasus. These had their hand against all. North-east of them were Kurds, settlers of some generations back, who were marrying Arabs and adopting their politics. They hated native Christians most; and, after them, they hated Turks and Europeans."

On 5 September 1997 an attack force of seaborne Israeli commandos was ambushed approaching Ansariye. The ambush had been prepared in advance by fighters from Amal and Hizbullah. The Lebanese army joined in the later stages of the incident. Twelve Israelis were killed.

References

External links
Insariyeh,  Localiban

Populated places in Sidon District